USS LST-924 was an  in the United States Navy. Like many of her class, she was not named and is properly referred to by her hull designation.

Construction
LST-924 was laid down on 8 May 1944, at Hingham, Massachusetts, by the Bethlehem-Hingham Shipyard; launched on 17 June 1944; and commissioned on 10 July 1944.

Service history
During World War II, LST-924 was assigned to the Asiatic-Pacific theater. She took part in the Leyte landings in November 1944, the Lingayen Gulf landings in January 1945, the Visayan Island landings in March and April 1945, and the Tarakan Island operation in April and May 1945.

Following the war, LST-924 performed occupation duty in the Far East and saw service in China until mid-May 1946. She was decommissioned on 13 June 1946, and struck from the Navy list on 3 July, that same year. On 5 May 1947, the ship was sold to the Royal Thai Navy (RTN) where it operated as HTMS Angthong (LST-1).

Thai Service
HTMS Angthong had been discarded by the Royal Thai Navy by 1978, but was later restored to service circa 1994–1995. In 1998, she was renumbered LST-711. She was decommissioned in 2006.

Awards
LST-924 earned four battle star for World War II service.

Notes

Citations

Bibliography 

Online resources

External links
 

 

LST-542-class tank landing ships
World War II amphibious warfare vessels of the United States
Ships built in Hingham, Massachusetts
1944 ships
Ships transferred from the United States Navy to the Royal Thai Navy
LST-542-class tank landing ships of the Royal Thai Navy